The Vergulde Draeck, also spelled Vergulde Draak and Vergulde Draek, was a ,  ship constructed in 1653 by the Dutch East India Company (commonly abbreviated to VOC).

The wrecking of the Vergulde Draeck
Vergulde Draeck was a ship purchased by the Amsterdam Chamber of the Dutch East India Company in 1653. On 4 October 1655 she departed Texel under the command of Pieter Albertszoon to sail for Batavia. The ship stopped at the Cape of Good Hope on 9 March 1656, having lost two crewmembers on the journey out. Vergulde Draeck left port four days later to continue on to Batavia.

On the night of the 28 April 1656, Vergulde Draeck struck a submerged coral reef midway between what are now the coastal towns of Seabird and Ledge Point, Western Australia. On board were 193 crew, eight boxes of silver coins worth 78,600 guilders and trade goods to the value of 106,400 guilders.

Of the 193 crew, 118 are believed to have perished. The initial 75 survivors, including the ship's captain Pieter Albertszoon, and the under steersman, made it to shore. They had with them the ship's boat, a schuyt, along with a small amount of provisions and stores washed on shore.

Arrival in Batavia 
On 7 May 1656, approximately nine days after the loss of the Vergulde Draeck, the under steersman and six crew members were dispatched to Batavia to summon help. They carried with them letters written by the crew which described the loss of the schuyt, the crew's decision to await rescue from Batavia, and their steadfast faith in the Lord God.

The alarm was raised and the search for the survivors of the Vergulde Draeck and cargo began.

Rescue attempts 
A number of rescue attempts were conducted by the Dutch East India Company once the loss was reported.

The Goede Hoop and the Witte Valck (1656)

On 7 June 1656, two rescue vessels, the Goede Hoop and the Witte Valck, were dispatched from Batavia. Large storms off the Western Australian coast meant that both ships were unsuccessful.

The Witte Valck failed to land men on the coast.

On 18 July 1656, the Goede Hoop managed to disembark men upon the shoreline; however, they lost three men along the coast who had wandered into the bush, before losing another eight men who went in search of them.

No sign of the survivors or wreckage was found.

The Vinck (1657)

On 23 April 1657, the Vinck in the process of setting sail from the Cape of Good Hope was instructed to search for the survivors on its passage to Batavia.

No sign of the survivors or wreckage was found.

The Waeckende Boey & the Emeloordt (1658)

On 1 January 1658, the Waeckende Boey and the Emeloordt were dispatched from Batavia. This time the rescue attempt was made in the more favourable summer months.

On 23 February 1658, Captain Volkersen of the Waeckende Boey sighted the Western Australian coastline, perhaps being the first European to sight what is today Rottnest Island, though it is possible Houtman may have sighted it in 1619.

On 26 February 1658, a shore party from the Waeckende Boey returning from the coast recorded the discovery of wreckage believed to be of the Vergulde Draeck. Most notable was a plank circle, a collection of some 12 to 13 planks placed in a circular fashion, dug into the beach sand with their ends facing skyward.

During the various searches, a small shore party from the Waeckende Boey led by Abraham Leeman became separated. Bad weather prevented Leeman from returning to the Waeckende Boey and after four days Leeman and his party were assumed lost. The modern town of Leeman, Western Australia is named after this Dutch explorer. Leeman eventually made it back to Batavia, his diary is in the National Maritime Museum in Amsterdam.

On 9 March 1658, Captain Jonck of the Emeloordt managed to send a small party to land. Upon returning, the shore party reported having seen three Aboriginal natives of tall stature who attempted to communicate with them using basic hand signals. This story of 'first contact' was a peaceful exchange, likely with the Yuet people of Western Australia.

The Emmenhorn (1659)

A further rescue attempt was made in 1659 by the vessel Emmenhorn but no sign of survivors or wreckage was found.

Discovery of the Vergulde Draeck
The wreck of the Vergulde Draeck was discovered was on 14 April 1963 south of Ledge Point, about 100 km north of Perth.

The identity of the official discoverers of the Vergulde Draeck has been a contentious issue over many years though it is generally accepted that the wreck was found by John Cowen; Jim, Alan and Graeme Henderson; and Alan Robinson. An alternative claim was made by Robinson in his In Australia Treasure is not for the Finder.

Artifacts from the wreckage were salvaged in 1963 and are located in the Fremantle Maritime Museum in Australia. They include lead, ivory, amber, coral and 10,000 coins.

Letters written by the survivors of the Vergulde Draeck
In March 2015, Steve Caffery, of Gilt Dragon Research Group, claimed to have discovered copies of two letters carried by the seven survivors to Batavia in 1656. The letters, dated 5 and 7 May 1656, were said to indicate there were two separate camp sites.

References

Further reading
Robinson, A. (1980). In Australia Treasure is not for the Finder. Perth. Vanguard Service Print. 
Gerritsen, R. (1994). And Their Ghosts May Be Heard. Perth. Lamb Print. 
Van Zanden, H. (2012). The Lost White Tribes of Australia 1656 Part One: The First Settlement of Australia. Australia. The Publishing Queen.

External links

 Gilt Dragon Research Group 
 WA Museum site general information
 WA Museum Site

1650s ships
Maritime incidents in 1656
Ships of the Dutch East India Company
Shipwrecks of Western Australia